Tucuruvi is a district located in the North Zone of the municipality of São Paulo, Brazil.

Etymology
The name "Tucuruvi" comes from the Tupi language and means "green grasshopper", through the combination of the terms tukura (grasshopper) and oby (green).

Transportation
Tucuruvi is served by Tucuruvi Station on Line 1 (Blue) of the São Paulo Metro.

References

Districts of São Paulo